Matt Hall may refer to:

Matt Hall (American football) (born 1990), American gridiron football player
Matt Hall (baseball) (born 1993), American baseball player
Matt Hall (pilot) (born 1971), Australian pilot
Matt Hall (politician), American politician from Michigan

See also 
Matthew Hall (disambiguation)